The White Poodle is a 1956 Soviet film directed by Marianna Roshal-Stroyeva and Vladimir Shredel. The screenplay was adapted by Grigorii Grebnev from the Aleksandr Kuprin story of the same name.  The main roles were played by Viktor Koltsov and Vladimir Polyakov, with others taken by Natalie Gitserot, Alexander Antonov and Georgy Millyar. Filmed in 1955, it was released in October 1956.

Plot
On the Crimean coast at the end of the 19th century, the old organ-grinder Lodyzhkin, his 12-year-old acrobat son Seryozha and their clever white poodle Arto put on shows for the locals and holidaymakers. They earn a modest living and despite the long walks the boy finds the strength to sing as they travel around. One day, in Yalta, they enter the garden of a luxurious house and put on a show before its owners and Trilly, a child nobody says no to. As they are about to leave, Trilly demands the poodle at any price and, despite his family's attempts to explain that the poodle is not for sale as he is central to their act, Trilly won't back down and a crisis ensues. His mother offers the organ-grinder a huge sum of money but he refuses and leaves. That night the dog disappears...

Cast
Viktor Koltsov as grandfather Lodizhkin
Vladimir Polyakov as Serge, acrobat
Natalia Gitserot as Ms. Obolyaninova
Alexander Antonov as janitor
Georgy Millyar as servant Ivan
Mikhail Gluzsky as fisherman
Simon Svashenko as Hobo
Galina Levchenko
Valentina Kutsenko as fisherwoman
Aleksandr Antonov as yardman

References

1956 films
1950s 3D films
Adaptations of works by Aleksandr Kuprin
Soviet drama films
1956 drama films
Odesa Film Studio films
Films about dogs
Films set in Crimea
Russian children's drama films
1950s children's drama films
1956 directorial debut films
Russian 3D films
Soviet 3D films
Soviet children's films